Wigland is a civil parish in Cheshire West and Chester, England.  It contains three buildings that are recorded in the National Heritage List for England as designated listed buildings, all of which are listed at Grade II.  This grade is the lowest of the three gradings given to listed buildings and is applied to "buildings of national importance and special interest".  The parish is entirely rural, and the listed buildings consist of farmhouses and farm buildings

References

Listed buildings in Cheshire West and Chester
Lists of listed buildings in Cheshire